Sir John Austen Hubback, KCSI (27 February 1878 – 8 May 1968) was a British administrator in India who was the first Governor of Odisha.

Educated at Winchester College and King's College, Cambridge, Hubback entered the Indian Civil Service in 1902. A member of the Executive Council, Bihar and Orissa, from 1935 to 1936, he was Governor of Orissa between 1936 and 1941, when he retired, 1941. He was adviser to Secretary of State for India between 1942 and 1947.

References 

Governors of Odisha
1878 births
1968 deaths
Knights Commander of the Order of the Star of India
Indian Civil Service (British India) officers
People educated at Winchester College
Alumni of King's College, Cambridge